Matt Burke (born March 25, 1976) is an American football coach who is the defensive coordinator for the Houston Texans of the National Football League (NFL). He was also previously the run game coordinator/defensive line coach for the Philadelphia Eagles, defensive coordinator for the Miami Dolphins, the linebackers coach for the Detroit Lions and Cincinnati Bengals, an assistant with the Tennessee Titans, and a defensive line coach for the Arizona Cardinals.

Playing career
Burke played safety at Dartmouth and was part of an undefeated Ivy League championship team in 1996.

Coaching career
While with the Dolphins, Burke was promoted to defensive coordinator, from the linebackers coach on January 12, 2017, after Vance Joseph left to become the head coach of the Denver Broncos. Burke was not retained by the Dolphins after they hired Brian Flores as their new head coach in February 2019.  Burke became a defensive special assistant with the Philadelphia Eagles on February 25, 2019. He was promoted to run game coordinator and defensive line coach on February 5, 2020.Burke was hired as a Arizona Cardinals defensive line coach on May 19, 2022. He was announced as the new defensive coordinator for the Houston Texans under new head coach Demeco Ryans on February 10, 2023.

Personal life
Burke was born in Hudson, Massachusetts. Burke spent the off-season in Africa in 2015 and 2016. He climbed Mount Kilimanjaro, has gone on safari in Botswana and has done charity work in Uganda.

References

External links
Arizona Cardinals bio

Living people
American football safeties
1976 births
Boston College Eagles football coaches
Cincinnati Bengals coaches
Dartmouth Big Green football players
Detroit Lions coaches
Harvard Crimson football coaches
Miami Dolphins coaches
National Football League defensive coordinators
Philadelphia Eagles coaches
People from Hudson, Massachusetts
Sportspeople from Middlesex County, Massachusetts
Tennessee Titans coaches
Arizona Cardinals coaches